Imilac is a pallasite meteorite found in the Atacama Desert of Northern Chile in 1822.

Classification 
Imilac is classified as a stony–iron pallasite. Imilac specimens are highly prized by meteorite collectors due to its high concentration of beautiful olivine grains.

Strewn field 
Numerous masses were found in a valley to the SW of Imilac.

Specimens 

Due to weathering, intact olivine grains are present only on large specimens (over ). Smaller samples contain darker altered olivine crystals. On the market there are also a lot of very small (few grams) Imilac individuals called metal skeletons: they are severely weathered and lack olivine grains.

Notes

See also
 Glossary of meteoritics
 
 

Meteorites found in Chile
Atacama Region
Stony-iron meteorites